Lunar Strain is the debut studio album by Swedish heavy metal band In Flames, released in April 1994. The album is known for its "folky elements", with the inclusion of violins and acoustic guitars.

It is the only In Flames album to not feature Anders Fridén as the vocalist and Björn Gelotte as either drummer or lead guitarist. Guitarist Jesper Strömblad plays the drums, while the vocals are sung by Dark Tranquillity vocalist Mikael Stanne, a session musician for In Flames at the time. Stanne had sung with the band previously on "Demo '93". Coincidentally, Fridén was the original vocalist for Dark Tranquillity and he effectively traded places with Stanne in 1995. As of 2010, no members who played on this album are still with the band.

The songs "Behind Space" and "Clad in Shadows" were re-recorded in the album Colony (1999), featuring In Flames' future lineup; both songs were renamed with the suffix '99 at the end of the title. "Clad in Shadows '99" was also released on the reissue of the album Whoracle (1997).

Reissues
In 1999, the album was re-released under the title Lunar Strain – Subterranean, including all tracks from the band's future release, Subterranean.

On the 2003 Regain Records re-release, the songs order differs slightly, with "Clad in Shadows" being the second track, shifting the rest down by one.  However, the discrepancy is not apparent in the album's track listing. Track 10, on the original release "Clad in Shadows", became Track 2 (this was not shown on the album's track list), and each track after track 2 ended up being credited as the track before (i.e. "Clad in Shadows" is credited as "Lunar Strain", and so on).

The album was re-released and remastered with bonus tracks in 2004 via Regain Records and in 2005 via Candlelight Records, featuring the same artwork but a more modern logo, as seen on Reroute to Remain and Come Clarity. The bonus tracks are actually three songs re-recorded from the band's 1993 demo, which contained "alternative mixed versions of the album recordings."

Track listing

Personnel
In Flames
Mikael Stanne – lead vocals
Glenn Ljungström – lead guitar
Carl Näslund – rhythm guitar
Johann Larsson – bass guitar
Jesper Strömblad – drums, keyboards, additional guitars

Guest musicians
Ylva Wåhlstedt – violins, viola
Jennica Johansson – vocal appearance
Oscar Dronjak – vocal appearance
Anders Iwers – lead guitar (tracks 8–9 and 1993 demo bonus tracks)

Technical personnel
Fredrik Nordström, H. Bjurkvist, J. Karlsson – engineering
In Flames, Fredrik Nordström – mixing
StageTech – production
Kenneth Johansson – cover art and photos
Henrik Lindahl – additional photos
Local Hero Music – layout

Release history

References

External links
Lunar Strain at Inflames.com (archived)

In Flames albums
1994 debut albums
Regain Records albums